This is a list of district-level subdivisions (Vietnamese: đơn vị hành chính cấp huyện) of Vietnam. This level includes: district-level cities (thành phố thuộc Thành phố trực thuộc trung ương, thành phố thuộc Tỉnh), towns (thị xã), rural districts (huyện) and urban districts (quận). These subdivisions are further divided into communes (xã) in rural areas (subdivisions under huyện, suburbans of towns and quận) and ward (phường) (subdivisions under cities and towns) in urban areas, and townships (thị trấn). 

The urban areas (cities and towns) in the district-level are classified into 5 classes (from 1st to 2nd class urban area is recognized by Prime Minister of Vietnam, 3rd to 4th class is recognized by Ministry of Construction (Vietnam), 5th class is recognized by provincial-class People's Committee).
1st class urban area: Haiphong, Đà Nẵng, Cần Thơ, Thủ Đức, Huế, Vinh, Đà Lạt, Nha Trang, Quy Nhơn, Buôn Ma Thuột, Thái Nguyên, Nam Định, Việt Trì, Vung Tàu, Hạ Long, Thanh Hóa, Biên Hòa, Mỹ Tho, Thủ Dầu Một, Bắc Ninh, Hải Dương, Pleiku, Long Xuyên. 
2nd class urban area: Phan Thiết, Cà Mau, Tuy Hoà, Uông Bí, Thái Bình, Rạch Giá, Bạc Liêu, Ninh Bình, Đồng Hới, Vĩnh Yên, Lào Cai, Bà Rịa, Bắc Giang, Phan Rang-Tháp Chàm, Châu Đốc, Cẩm Phả, Quảng Ngãi, Tam Kỳ, Trà Vinh, Sa Đéc, Móng Cái, Phủ Lý, Bến Tre, Hà Tĩnh, Lạng Sơn, Sơn La, Tân An, Vị Thanh, Cao Lãnh, and Phú Quốc district.
3rd class urban area: Yên Bái, Điện Biên Phủ, Hoà Bình, Sóc Trăng, Hội An, Hưng Yên, Vĩnh Long, Đông Hà, Kon Tum, Bảo Lộc, Tuyên Quang, Hà Giang, Cam Ranh, Cao Bằng, Lai Châu, Tây Ninh, Bắc Kạn, Tam Điệp, Sông Công, Sầm Sơn, Phúc Yên, Hà Tiên, Đồng Xoài, Chí Linh, Long Khánh, Gia Nghĩa, Dĩ An, Ngã Bảy, Thuận An, Sơn Tây, Cửa Lò, Phú Thọ, Bỉm Sơn, Gò Công, La Gi, Từ Sơn, Bến Cát, Tân Uyên, Hồng Ngự, Sông Cầu, Phổ Yên, Long Mỹ, Tân Châu, Cai Lậy.
4th class urban area: recognized by Ministry of Construction (Vietnam).
5th class urban area (for townships): not in district-level.

The district-level subdivisions are tabulated alphabetically:

External links
Codes of district-level subdivisions in Vietnam, 29 June 2004
Codes and names of district-level subdivisions in Vietnam

Districts of Vietnam
District
District Level